Sarah Blanche Sweet (June 18, 1896 – September 6, 1986) was an American silent film actress who began her career in the early days of the motion picture film industry.

Early life 
Born Sarah Blanche Sweet (though her first name Sarah was rarely used) in Chicago, Illinois in 1896, she was the daughter of Pearl Alexander, a dancer, and Gilbert Joel Sweet, a wine merchant. The actors Antrim and Gertrude Short were cousins of Blanche. Her mother died when Blanche was an infant, and she was raised by her maternal grandmother, Cora Blanche Alexander. Cora Alexander found her many parts as a young child. At age 4, she toured in the play The Battle of the Strong with Marie Burroughs and Maurice Barrymore.

A decade later, Sweet acted with Barrymore's son Lionel in a D. W. Griffith-directed film. In 1909, she started work at Biograph Studios under contract to director D. W. Griffith. By 1910, she had become a rival to Mary Pickford, who had started for Griffith the previous year.

Rise to stardom 

Sweet was known for her energetic, independent roles, at variance with the 'ideal' Griffith type of vulnerable, often fragile, femininity. After many starring roles, her landmark film was the 1911 Griffith thriller The Lonedale Operator. In 1913, she starred in Judith of Bethulia, Griffith's first feature film. In 1914, Sweet was cast by Griffith in the part of Elsie Stoneman in his epic The Birth of a Nation, but the role was given to Lillian Gish, who was Sweet's senior by three years. The same year, Sweet parted ways with Griffith and joined Paramount (then Famous Players-Lasky) for the much higher pay that studio was able to afford.

Because the Biograph company refused to reveal the names of its actors, the British distributor M. P. Sales billed Sweet as Daphne Wayne.

Throughout the 1910s, Sweet continued her career appearing in a number of highly prominent roles in films and remained a publicly popular leading lady. She often starred in vehicles by Cecil B. DeMille and Marshall Neilan, and she was recognised by leading film critics of the time to be one of the foremost actresses of the entire silent era. It was during her time working with Neilan that the two began a publicized affair, which brought on his divorce from former actress Gertrude Bambrick. Sweet and Neilan married in 1922. The union ended in 1929 with Sweet's charging that Neilan was a persistent adulterer.

During the early 1920s, Sweet's career continued to prosper, and she starred in the first film version of Anna Christie in 1923. The film is notable as being the first Eugene O'Neill play to be made into a motion picture. In successive years, she starred in Tess of the d'Urbervilles and The Sporting Venus, both directed by Neilan. Sweet soon began a career phase as one of the newly formed MGM studio's bigger stars.

Sound film and later career 
Sweet's career faltered with the advent of sound films. Sweet made just three talking pictures, including her critically lauded performance in Show Girl in Hollywood (1930), then retired in 1930 and married stage actor Raymond Hackett in 1935. The marriage lasted until Hackett's death in 1958.

Sweet spent the remainder of her performing career in radio and in secondary stage roles on Broadway. Eventually, her career in both of these fields faded, and she began working in a department store in Los Angeles. In the late 1960s, her acting legacy was resurrected when film scholars invited her to Europe to receive recognition for her work.

In 1975, she was honored with the George Eastman Award for distinguished contribution to the art of film.

In 1980, Sweet was one of the many featured surviving silent film stars interviewed at length in Kevin Brownlow's documentary Hollywood.

Sweet is the subject of a 1982 documentary by Anthony Slide, titled Portrait of Blanche Sweet, in which she talks of her life and her career. On September 24, 1984, a tribute to Sweet was held at the Museum of Modern Art in New York City. Sweet introduced her 1925 film The Sporting Venus.

Death 
Sweet died of a stroke in New York City on September 6, 1986. Her ashes were later scattered within the Brooklyn Botanic Gardens.

Filmography

Notes

References

External links 

 
 
 
 Blanche Sweet at Golden Silents
 Some contemporary interviews with Blanche Sweet
 Photographs and literature on Blanche Sweet
 The Girl Who Reads Tennyson Between Scenes - from Motion Picture Magazine, 1916

1896 births
1986 deaths
American child actresses
American stage actresses
American silent film actresses
Actresses from Chicago
Western (genre) film actresses
Vaudeville performers
Paramount Pictures contract players
20th-century American actresses